Hafslund is a borough located east of the city centre in the city of Sarpsborg, Norway,

Before 1992, Hafslund was a part of Skjeberg municipality. The name Hafslund, which is composed of Hafr, the Old Norse name for husband and lundr meaning  grove. There has been a permanent settlement at Hafslund for over 5000 years.

Hafslund Manor
Hafslund Manor (Hafslund Hovedgård) is an estate located just outside Hafslund. At various times, it was owned by the Østby family and, later, the industrialist and timber merchant Benjamin Wegner and by Maren Juel who regarded during  her lifetime as the wealthiest woman in Norway. The property is now approximately 6,000 acres, of which approximately a quarter of the acreage is forested. About 2,000 acres leased for residential and industrial land.

The first public record of Hafslund dates to 1344, at which time the farm was crown property. Hafslund Manor dates from 1761. The manor house is located at the old Sandesund ferry site. It was built after the earlier Baroque building burned down in the autumn of 1757. Hafslund Manor has well-preserved buildings and interiors. The main buildings were restored in 1937. Hafslund Manor is now a protected monument. The manor is owned by the industrial group Hafslund ASA with the main building used for meetings and representation by the Hafslund Group.

References

External links
Hafslund Hovedgård

Villages in Østfold
Sarpsborg
Manor houses in Norway